The Mystery of Al Capone's Vaults is a two-hour live American television special that was broadcast in syndication on April 21, 1986, and hosted by Geraldo Rivera. It centered on the live opening of a walled-off underground room in the Lexington Hotel in Chicago once owned by noted crime lord Al Capone, which turned out to be empty except for debris. Thirty million viewers watched, making it the "highest rated syndicated special" in history. Rivera had inadvertently launched a "no-news" form of news, where instead of reporting on news, entire programs were about possible and hypothetical news. Included in this were news channels counting down and hyping an upcoming news event, like a presidential briefing.

Background
Al Capone was born to Italian immigrant parents on January 17, 1899, in New York City. He moved to Chicago in 1919, and there he became a notable criminal figure and gangster. He played large parts in gambling, alcohol, and prostitution rackets. In 1925, after an assassination attempt on former head Johnny Torrio, Capone took control of the Chicago Outfit organized crime syndicate, which he had served as second in command. He was listed on the FBI's "Most Wanted" list, transported and sold alcohol during the Prohibition era, planned the St. Valentine's Day massacre, and was eventually indicted and convicted of income tax evasion in 1931. In 1939, he was released from Alcatraz prison on humanitarian grounds, due to acutely advancing syphilis. He died on January 25, 1947, in his home in Palm Island, Florida, from cardiac arrest after suffering a stroke a week after his 48th birthday.

Program
Capone had previously housed his headquarters at the Metropole Hotel in Chicago, but in July 1928 moved to a suite at the nearby Lexington Hotel. Capone ran his various enterprises from this hotel until his arrest in 1931. A construction company in the 1980s planned a renovation of the Lexington Hotel, and while surveying the building had discovered a number of walled-off subterranean chambers on the property.

Geraldo Rivera had been fired from ABC in 1985 after criticizing the network for canceling a report on an alleged relationship between John F. Kennedy and Marilyn Monroe. He then hosted the special The Mystery of Al Capone's Vaults which was broadcast live on April 21, 1986. The two-hour special (including commercials) was greatly hyped as potentially revealing great riches or dead bodies on live television. This included the presence of a medical examiner should bodies be found, and agents from the Internal Revenue Service to collect any of Capone's money that might be discovered.

When the vault was finally opened, the only things found inside were dirt and several empty bottles, including one Rivera claimed was for moonshine bathtub gin. After several attempts to dig further into the vault, Geraldo admitted defeat and voiced his disappointment to the viewers, apologizing as he thanked the excavation team for their efforts. Although it gathered criticism and became infamous for its disappointing ending, the program was the most-watched syndicated television special that year with an estimated audience of 30 million. After the show, Rivera was quoted as saying "Seems like we struck out". Geraldo said on the April 20, 2016, edition of the Fox News Channel program The Five that he went right across the street and got "tequila drunk" after the special aired, then went back to his hotel room and put the "Do Not Disturb" sign on the door. However, in his 1991 autobiography Exposing Myself, he wrote, regarding the event, "My career was not over, I knew, but had just begun. And all because of a silly, high-concept stunt that failed to deliver on its titillating promise."

Similar events
This was not the first time a vault was opened on live TV: in 1984, a safe recovered from the shipwreck SS Andrea Doria was opened.  During the broadcast, all that was revealed were a few silver certificates floating at the top of the waterlogged safe. Peter Gimbel, who recovered the safe and arranged the TV event, said the media "felt ripped off because there wasn't a treasure".

See also

 Eaten Alive

Notes

External links
 
 Al Capone's Vault on TV Acres. Retrieved July 8, 2006.
 Geraldo Rivera  on the Museum of Broadcast Communications by Susan Murray. Retrieved July 8, 2006.
 The Lexington Hotel  on Prairie Ghosts in 2003 by Troy Taylor. Retrieved July 8, 2006.
 Official Website (archived)

1986 in American television
Works about Al Capone
1980s American television specials
Nexstar Media Group